In chemistry, a lyonium ion is the cation derived by the protonation of a solvent molecule.

Its counterpart is a lyate ion, the anion formed by the deprotonation of a solvent molecule.

Lyonium and lyate ions, resulting from molecular autoionization, contribute to the molar conductivity of protolytic solvents.

Examples

See also
Lyate ion, a deprotonated solvent molecule
Onium ion, a protonated molecule more generally
Ion transport number
Ionic atmosphere

References

Acids
Cations